The Saint Vincent and the Grenadines national basketball team represents Saint Vincent and the Grenadines in international competitions. It is administrated by the St. Vincent and the Grenadines Basketball Association.

Its best result was 6th place at the 2015 FIBA CBC Championship.

Competitions

FIBA AmeriCup

yet to qualify

Caribbean Championship

Current roster
2018 Squad at FIBA AmeriCup 2021 Pre-Qualifiers:

Depth chart

Past rosters
Team for the 2015 FIBA CBC Championship.

See also
Saint Vincent and the Grenadines women's national basketball team

References

External links
Presentation at CaribbeanBasketball.com
Archived records of Saint Vincent and the Grenadines team participations
St. Vincent and the Grenadines Basketball Association  - Facebook Presentation
St. Vincent and the Grenadines Men National Team 2015 Presentation at Latinbasket.com

Videos
 St. Vincent & the Grenadines vs. Antigua - Group A - 2014 CBC Championship Youtube.com video

Men's national basketball teams
Basketball
Basketball in Saint Vincent and the Grenadines
1984 establishments in Saint Vincent and the Grenadines